Peter John Sallis  (1 February 1921 – 2 June 2017) was an English actor, mainly known for his work in television.

He was the voice of Wallace in the Academy Award-winning Wallace and Gromit films and portrayed Norman "Cleggy" Clegg in Last of the Summer Wine from its 1973 inception until the final episode in 2010, making him the only actor to appear in all 295 episodes. Additionally, he portrayed Norman Clegg's father in the prequel series First of the Summer Wine. Although Sallis was born and brought up in London, the characters of Wallace and Clegg were both Northerners.

Among his television credits, Sallis appeared in Danger Man, The Avengers, Doctor Who ("The Ice Warriors"), The Persuaders! and The Ghosts of Motley Hall.  His  film appearances include the Hammer horror films The Curse of the Werewolf (1961) and Taste the Blood of Dracula (1970).

Early life
Peter John Sallis was born on 1 February 1921 in Twickenham, Middlesex, the only child of Dorothy Amea Frances (née Barnard; 1891–1975) and Harry Sallis (1889–1964), a bank manager. After attending Minchenden Grammar School in Southgate, North London, Sallis went to work in a bank, working on shipping transactions.

He became a wireless mechanic instead and went on to teach radio procedures at RAF Cranwell.

Career

Theatre work
Sallis began his career as an amateur actor during his four years with the RAF when one of his students offered him the lead in an amateur production of Noël Coward's Hay Fever. After his success in the role, he resolved to become an actor after the war, winning a Korda scholarship and training at the Royal Academy of Dramatic Art. He made his first professional appearance on the London stage in September 1946 in a walk-on part in Richard Brinsley Sheridan's The Scheming Lieutenant (1775).

Sallis then spent three years in repertory theatre before appearing in his first speaking role on the London stage in 1949. Other roles followed in the 1950s and 1960s including Orson Welles' 1955 production of Moby Dick—Rehearsed. In his autobiography, Fading into the Limelight, Sallis recounts a later meeting with Welles where he received a mysterious telephone call summoning him to the deserted Gare d'Orsay in Paris where Welles announced he wanted him to dub Hungarian bit-players in his cinema adaptation of Franz Kafka's The Trial (1962). Sallis wrote that "the episode was Kafka-esque, to coin a phrase". Later, he was in the first West End production of Cabaret in 1968 opposite Judi Dench.

Sallis appeared in the Hal Prince–produced musical She Loves Me in 1963. Though not a success, it led to him making his Broadway debut the following year. Prince was producer of a musical based on the work of Sir Arthur Conan Doyle's Sherlock Holmes called Baker Street. Sallis was asked by Prince to take the role of Dr. Watson to Fritz Weaver's Sherlock Holmes. The show ran for six months on Broadway. 

Just before Baker Street ended he was offered the role of Wally in John Osborne's Inadmissible Evidence, which had been played by Arthur Lowe in London with Nicol Williamson reprising the lead role. The production was troubled with Williamson hitting producer David Merrick with a bottle and walking out before being persuaded to continue. The show was a minor success and ran for six months in New York, opening at the Belasco Theater before transferring to the Shubert Theater. Sallis reprised his role in the 1968 film adaptation.

Television and films
Sallis' first extended television role was as Samuel Pepys in the BBC serial of the same name in 1958. He appeared in Danger Man in the episode "Find and Destroy", (1960–1963) he played Armand Lachaume in the Maigret TV series (1961) as Gordon. He appeared in the BBC Doctor Who story The Ice Warriors (1967), playing renegade scientist Elric Penley; and in 1983 was due to play the role of Striker in another Doctor Who serial, Enlightenment, but he had to withdraw and was replaced by Keith Barron.

He appeared as schoolteacher Mr Gladstone in an episode of the first series of Catweazle in 1970.  He was cast in the BBC comedy series The Culture Vultures (1970), which saw him play stuffy Professor George Hobbs to Leslie Phillips's laid-back rogue Dr Michael Cunningham. During the production, Phillips was rushed to hospital with an internal haemorrhage and as a result, only five episodes were completed.

Sallis acted alongside Roger Moore and Tony Curtis in an episode of The Persuaders! ("The Long Goodbye", 1971). He appeared in many British films of the 1960s and 1970s,including Saturday Night and Sunday Morning (1960), Doctor in Love (1960), The Curse of the Werewolf (1961), The V.I.P.s (1963), Charlie Bubbles (1967), Scream and Scream Again (1969), Taste the Blood of Dracula, Wuthering Heights (1970), The Incredible Sarah (1976) and Who Is Killing the Great Chefs of Europe? (1978). Additionally, in 1968, he was cast as the well-intentioned Coker in a BBC Radio production of John Wyndham's The Day of the Triffids.

He played a priest in the TV film Frankenstein: The True Story (1973), and the following year he played Mr Bonteen in the BBC period drama The Pallisers.

Sallis was cast in a pilot for Comedy Playhouse which became the first episode of Last of the Summer Wine (retrospectively titled "Of Funerals and Fish", 1973), as the unobtrusive lover of a quiet life, Norman Clegg. The pilot was successful and the BBC commissioned a series. Sallis had already worked on stage with Michael Bates, who played the unofficial ringleader Blamire in the first two series. Sallis played the role of Clegg from 1973 to 2010, and was the only cast member to appear in every episode. He also appeared, in 1988, as Clegg's father in First of the Summer Wine, a prequel to Last of the Summer Wine set in 1939.

He appeared in the children's series The Ghosts of Motley Hall (1976–78), in which he played Arnold Gudgin, an estate agent who did not want to see the hall fall into the wrong hands, and he played Rodney Gloss in the BBC series Murder Most English (1977). In the same period, he starred alongside Northern comic actor David Roper in the ITV sitcom Leave it to Charlie as Charlie's pessimistic boss. The programme ran for four series, ending in 1980. Sallis also played the part of the ghost-hunter Milton Guest in the children's paranormal drama series The Clifton House Mystery (1978).

Voice acting
Sallis was the narrator on Rocky Hollow (1983), a show produced by Bumper Films, who later produced Fireman Sam, and understudied Ian Carmichael as the voice of Rat in the British television series The Wind in the Willows (1984–89), based on the book by Kenneth Grahame and produced by Cosgrove Hall Films. Alongside him were Michael Hordern as Badger, David Jason as Toad and Richard Pearson as Mole. The series was animated in stop motion, prefiguring his work with Aardman Animations. Also in 1983 he played the lead character Jim Bloggs, alongside Brenda Bruce as Hilda, in a BBC Radio 4 adaptation of Raymond Briggs' When the Wind Blows. Sallis appeared in the last episode of Rumpole of the Bailey (1992) and he later starred alongside Brenda Blethyn, Kevin Whately and Anna Massey in the one-off ITV1 drama Belonging (2004).

Sallis also narrated a few stories of the children's television series Postman Pat for audio cassettes when the original voice actor Ken Barrie wasn't available at the time and also voiced Hugo in the animated series Victor and Hugo: Bunglers in Crime (filling in for The Wind in the Willows co-star David Jason who was the usual voice of Hugo, although Jason's voice of Hugo can still be heard in the opening and closing theme songs) for audio cassettes as well.

While a student in 1983, animator Nick Park wrote to Sallis asking him if he would voice his character Wallace, an eccentric inventor. Sallis agreed to do so for a donation of £50 to his favourite charity. The work was eventually released in 1989 and Aardman Animations' Wallace and Gromit: A Grand Day Out went on to win a BAFTA award. Sallis reprised his role in the Oscar- and BAFTA Award-winning films The Wrong Trousers in 1993 and A Close Shave in 1995.

Though the characters were temporarily retired in 1996, Sallis returned to voice Wallace in several short films and in the Oscar-winning 2005 motion picture Wallace & Gromit: The Curse of the Were-Rabbit, for which he won an Annie Award for Best Voice Acting in an Animated Feature Production. In 2008, Sallis voiced a new Wallace and Gromit adventure, A Matter of Loaf and Death. After the Curse of the Were-Rabbit, Sallis's eyesight began to fail as a result of macular degeneration and he used a talking portable typewriter with a specially illuminated scanner to continue working. His last role as Wallace was in 2010's Wallace and Gromit's World of Invention. Sallis then retired due to ill health, with Ben Whitehead taking over the role.

Autobiography 
In 2006, Sallis published an autobiography entitled Fading into the Limelight; this was reissued in 2014 as Summer Wine and Other Stories: My Autobiography As well as his 36 years in Last of the Summer Wine, Sallis also recounted the early era of his relationship with Wallace and Gromit creator Nick Park when it took six years for A Grand Day Out to be completed. He said that his work as Wallace "raised his standing a few notches in the public eye".

Personal life
Sallis married actress Elaine Usher at St. John's Wood Church in London on 9 February 1957. However, it was a turbulent relationship, with Usher leaving him sixteen times before they divorced in 1965 on grounds of desertion and adultery. They reconciled in 1983 and continued to live together until 1999. Sallis remained close to Usher until her death in 2014. They had one son, Timothy Crispian, who went on to become an Oscar-nominated film set designer.

Sallis suffered from macular degeneration, and in 2005 recorded an appeal on BBC Radio 4 on behalf of the Macular Society of which he was a patron. He also recorded on behalf of the society a television appeal, which was broadcast on BBC One on 8 March 2009. Following his diagnosis of the disease, Aardman produced a short animated film for the society.

Sallis was awarded an Order of the British Empire in the 2007 Birthday Honours for services to Drama. On 17 May 2009, he appeared on the BBC Radio 4 programme Desert Island Discs, selecting Sibelius' Symphony No. 5 in E-flat major as his favourite.

Death
Sallis died at Denville Hall, a professional actors' retirement home, in Northwood, London, on 2 June 2017. He was 96 years old. He was buried next to fellow Last of the Summer Wine actor Bill Owen in the churchyard of St John's Parish Church, Upperthong, near the town of Holmfirth in Yorkshire, the home of Last of the Summer Wine.

Filmography

Film

Television

Video games

Radio
Hercule Poirot's Christmas (1986) – Hercule Poirot. BBC Radio adaption.
Living with Betty (1986) – Harold. Radio sitcom first broadcast on BBC Radio 2 in 1986
The Adventure of the Norwood Builder (1993) – Jonas Oldacre

References

External links
 Peter Sallis at the British Film Institute
 
 

1921 births
2017 deaths
20th-century English male actors
21st-century English male actors
Actors from Twickenham
Alumni of RADA
Annie Award winners
British male comedy actors
English entertainers
English male film actors
English male stage actors
English male television actors
English male voice actors
Male actors from London
Officers of the Order of the British Empire
Royal Air Force airmen
Royal Air Force personnel of World War II